"9 to 5" is a song written and recorded by American entertainer Dolly Parton for the 1980 comedy film of the same name. In addition to appearing on the film soundtrack, the song was the centerpiece of Parton's album 9 to 5 and Odd Jobs, released in late 1980. The song was released as a single in November 1980.

The song garnered Parton an Academy Award nomination and four Grammy Award nominations, winning her the awards for Best Country Song and Best Country Vocal Performance, Female. For a time, the song became something of an anthem for office workers in the US, and in 2004, Parton's song ranked at number 78 on the American Film Institute's '100 Years, 100 Songs'.

The song was accompanied by a music video that featured footage of Parton and her band performing, intercut with scenes from the film.

Background
The song was written for the comedy film 9 to 5, starring Jane Fonda, Lily Tomlin, and Parton in her film debut. The song—and film—owe their titles to 9to5, an organization founded in 1973 with the aim of bringing about fair pay and equal treatment for women in the workplace.

The song is also featured in a musical theater adaptation of the film, featuring a book by the film's original writer, Patricia Resnick, and 20 additional songs written by Dolly Parton. 9 to 5 began showing previews in Los Angeles on September 9, 2008, and played on Broadway at the Marquis Theatre from April until September 2009 before touring.
In 2012, a UK theatre tour of 9 to 5 began.

A few months before Parton's song and the film, Scottish singer Sheena Easton released a single called "9 to 5" in the UK. When Easton's song was released in the U.S. the following year it was renamed "Morning Train (Nine to Five)" to avoid confusion. Easton's single reached the number one spot on the Billboard Hot 100 chart three months after Parton's song left that spot. Despite similar titles, the two songs are different in lyrical themes. While Parton's song is about a working woman, Easton's song is about a woman waiting at home for her lover to return from work.

Although the Parton recording only reached No. 47 in the UK, it remains a popular song on radio and in nightclubs through Britain and was spliced between "Independent Women Part 1" by Destiny's Child and "Eple" by Röyksopp for the Soulwax album As Heard on Radio Soulwax Pt. 2.

Commercial performance
"9 to 5" reached number one on the Billboard Country chart in January 1981.  In February 1981, it went to number one on both the Billboard Hot 100 and the Adult Contemporary charts, respectively. It became Parton's first and only solo number one entry on the former. (Parton would later team up with Kenny Rogers on their number one duet "Islands in the Stream".) The song was certified gold on February 19, 1981, indicating shipment 1,000,000 of physical copies. It was certified platinum on September 25, 2017. The song has accrued 500,000 digital downloads  in the United States after it was made available for download in the 21st century.

The song peaked at number 47 on the UK Singles Chart in 1981. It has sold 303,511 digital copies in the UK . , it is Parton's biggest download in the UK, totaling 340,800, while it has also been streamed 8.46 million times.

Notes
This song is one of the few Billboard chart songs to feature the clacking of a typewriter. Parton has stated in a number of interviews that when she wrote the song, she devised the clacking typewriter rhythm by running her acrylic fingernails back and forth against one another.

With "9 to 5", Parton became only the second woman to top both the U.S. country singles chart and the Billboard Hot 100 with the same single (the first being Jeannie C. Riley, who had done so with "Harper Valley PTA" in 1968).

"9 to 5" served at the theme song for the mid-1980s sitcom 9 to 5 which derived from the film. Phoebe Snow sang the theme for the four-episode premiere season, which aired in March and April 1982; however, Dolly Parton would be heard singing the theme for the sitcom's 1982–1983 run and for its 1986–1988 revival.

Songwriters Neil and Jan Goldberg filed a lawsuit against Parton, claiming that "9 to 5" was a copy of their 1976 song "Money World". In December 1985 the court ruled in Parton's favor.

U.S. Senator Elizabeth Warren frequently used the song at campaign appearances during her 2020 presidential campaign, with it often playing when she took the stage. Reacting to the song's use, Parton's manager Danny Nozell said, "We did not approve the request, and we do not approve requests like this of (a) political nature."

In early 2021, Parton recorded a new version of the song titled "5 to 9" for a Squarespace advert in the Super Bowl LV.

Personnel

 Dolly Parton – lead vocals, nails
 Jeff Baxter, Marty Walsh – guitars
 Abraham Laboriel – bass
 Larry Knechtel – piano
 Rick Shlosser – drums
 Leonard Castro – percussion
 William Reichenbach – trombone
 Tom Salviano – saxophone
 Kim S. Hutchroft – baritone saxophone
 Jerry Hey – trumpet
 Denise Maynelli, Stephanie Spruill, Marti McCall – background vocals

Charts

Weekly charts

Year-end charts

Certifications

See also
List of Billboard Hot 100 number one-singles of 1981

References

External links
 9 to 5 lyrics at LyricsUpdate.com

1980 songs
1980 singles
1981 singles
Dolly Parton songs
Billboard Hot 100 number-one singles
Cashbox number-one singles
RPM Top Singles number-one singles
Film theme songs
Songs written by Dolly Parton
Songs written for films
RCA Records singles
Songs about labor
Songs with feminist themes
Songs used as jingles